Săvescu is a Romanian surname. Notable people with the surname include:

 Iuliu Cezar Săvescu (1866–1903), Romanian poet
 Napoleon Săvescu

See also
 Săvescu River

Romanian-language surnames